I. A. L. Diamond (born Ițec (Itzek) Domnici; June 27, 1920 – April 21, 1988) was a Romanian–American screenwriter, best known for his collaborations with Billy Wilder.

Life and career
Diamond was born in Ungheni, Iași County, Bessarabia, Romania, i.e. present day Moldova. He emigrated with his mother and sister, following his father to the Crown Heights area of Brooklyn in the United States. There, he studied at the Boy's High School, showing ability in mathematics, competing in the state Mathematics Olympiads in 1936–37 and winning several medals therein.  Diamond was referred to as "Iz" in Hollywood, and was known to quip that his initials stood for "Interscholastic Algebra League", a prize he also won while attending Boys' High School. Diamond completed his undergraduate studies at Columbia in 1941. There he studied journalism, publishing in the Columbia Daily Spectator under the pseudonym "I. A. L. Diamond".  He was editor of the humor magazine Jester of Columbia and a member of the Philolexian Society. He became the only person to single-handedly write four consecutive productions of the annual revue, the Varsity Show and a spare should they need one. After graduating, he abandoned the plan to pursue his master's in engineering at Columbia and accepted a short-term contract in Hollywood. A succession of limited-term contracts ensued, notably at Paramount, where Diamond worked on projects without receiving a writing credit. He moved to Universal Pictures, where he made his first film Murder in the Blue Room.  It was a year later at Warner Bros., that he achieved his first real success and consequent recognition with Never Say Goodbye. He worked at 20th Century Fox for four years. In 1957, he began collaborating with Billy Wilder, working on the film Love in the Afternoon. They later wrote the classic films, Some Like It Hot, The Apartment (which won an Academy Award for Best Original Screenplay), One, Two, Three, Irma la Douce, Kiss Me, Stupid and The Private Life of Sherlock Holmes. In 1969, Diamond wrote the screenplay for the film adaptation. In total, Diamond and Wilder wrote the scripts for twelve films. Some featured characters engaging in an endless but friendly squabbling, such as Joe and Jerry in Some Like it Hot and Holmes and Watson in The Private Life of Sherlock Holmes. Diamond's widow said that these characters were based on her husband's relationship with Wilder. In 1980, Diamond and Wilder received the Writers Guild of America's Laurel Award for career achievement in screenwriting. Wilder had previously received the Laurel Award in 1957 for his partnership with Charles Brackett. Diamond died of multiple myeloma on April 21, 1988.

Filmography

As writer
 Buddy Buddy (1981)
 Fedora (1978)
 The Front Page (1974)
 Avanti! (1972)
 The Private Life of Sherlock Holmes (1970)
 Cactus Flower (1969)
 The Fortune Cookie (1966)
 Kiss Me, Stupid (1964)
 Irma la Douce (1963)
 One, Two, Three (1961)
 The Apartment (1960)
 Some Like It Hot (1959) (screenplay)
 Merry Andrew (1958)
 Love in the Afternoon (1957)
 That Certain Feeling (1956)
 Something for the Birds (1952)
 Monkey Business (1952)
 Let's Make It Legal (1951)
 Love Nest (1951)
 It's a Great Feeling (1949) (story)
 The Girl from Jones Beach (1949)
 Two Guys from Texas (1948)
 Romance on the High Seas (1948) (additional dialogue)
 Always Together (1948)
 Love and Learn (1947)
 Never Say Goodbye (1946)
 Two Guys from Milwaukee (1946)
 Murder in the Blue Room (1944)

As associate producer
 Fedora (1978)
 The Private Life of Sherlock Holmes (1970)
 The Fortune Cookie (1966)
 Kiss Me, Stupid (1964)
 Irma la Douce (1963)
 One, Two, Three (1961)
 The Apartment (1960)
 Some Like It Hot (1959)

Award and honors

Academy Awards

Golden Globe Awards

WGA Awards
1957: Love in the Afternoon – American Comedy
1959: Some Like It Hot – American Comedy
1960: The Apartment – American Comedy
1961: One, Two, Three – American Comedy
1963: Irma la Douce – American Comedy
1966: The Fortune Cookie – American Comedy
1969: Cactus Flower – Adapted Screenplay (Comedy)
1970: The Private Life of Sherlock Holmes – Original Screenplay (Comedy)
1972: Avanti! – Adapted Screenplay (Comedy)
1974: The Front Page – Adapted Screenplay (Comedy)
1980: Laurel Award for Screenwriting Achievement

References

External links

1920 births
1988 deaths
Best Original Screenplay Academy Award winners
Romanian Jews
Romanian emigrants to the United States
American male screenwriters
Jewish American writers
Columbia College (New York) alumni
People from Ungheni
Boys High School (Brooklyn) alumni
Screenwriters from New York (state)
People from Crown Heights, Brooklyn
Deaths from multiple myeloma
Deaths from cancer in California
20th-century American male writers
20th-century American screenwriters
20th-century American Jews